Patrice Barnes is a Canadian politician, who was elected to the Legislative Assembly of Ontario in the 2022 provincial election. She represents the riding of Ajax as a member of the Progressive Conservative Party of Ontario.

Barnes is a former school trustee.

References 

Living people
Progressive Conservative Party of Ontario MPPs
21st-century Canadian politicians
21st-century Canadian women politicians
Jamaican emigrants to Canada
Black Canadian politicians
Black Canadian women
Women MPPs in Ontario
Ontario school board trustees
Year of birth missing (living people)